Erminio Asin (born 27 March 1914 in Venice) was an Italian footballer.

He played for 3 seasons (9 games, no goals) in the Serie A for A.S. Roma.

External links

1914 births
Year of death missing
Italian footballers
Serie A players
A.S. Roma players
S.S.D. Lucchese 1905 players
Association football defenders